Clogs are a type of footwear made in part or completely from wood. Used in many parts of the world, their forms can vary by culture, but often remained unchanged for centuries within a culture.

Traditional clogs remain in use as protective footwear in agriculture and in some factories and mines. Although they are sometimes negatively associated with cheap and folkloric footwear of farmers and the working class, some types are considered fashion wear today, such as Swedish träskor or Japanese geta.

Clogs are also used in several different styles of dance, where an important feature is the sound they produce against the floor. Clog dancing is one of the fundamental roots of tap dancing, but with tap shoes the taps are free to click against each other and produce a different sound from clogs.

Types

The Oxford English Dictionary defines a clog as a "thick piece of wood", and later as a "wooden soled overshoe" and a "shoe with a thick wooden sole".

Welsh traditional clog maker Trefor Owen identified three main varieties of clogs: wooden upper, wooden soled and overshoes.
 Wooden upper clogs; are made by hollowing out a lump of solid wood to make a combined upper and lower. Two main variants can be seen:
 whole foot clogs; where the wooden upper covers the whole of the foot to near the ankle, such as the Dutch klomp. They are also known as "wooden shoes".  Whole foot clogs can give sufficient protection to be used as safety footwear without additional reinforcements.
 half open clogs; where the wooden upper extends over the toes or slightly further, such as the Belgian sabots. The upper is similar in outline to a court shoe. Half open clogs may have additional covering or securing straps in some sort of fabric or leather.
 Wooden soled clogs; use wood for the sole only. Wooden soled clogs come with a variety of uppers:
 complete uppers made from leather or similar material, such as English clogs. For more protection, they may have steel toecaps and/or steel reinforcing inserts in the undersides of the soles
 open sandal type fitting. For example, Japanese geta
 toe peg styles. For example, Indian paduka
 Overshoes; are wooden soles with straps designed to be worn over other footwear for protection, commonly known as pattens. Patten style clogs are not used anymore. However the derivative galoshes are common worldwide.
These divisions are not fixed: some overshoes look more like whole foot clogs, like Spanish albarca, whilst other wooden soled clogs raise and protect clothing in the way that overshoes do, such as Japanese geta.

The type of upper determines how the clogs are worn. Whole foot clogs need to be close fitting and can be secured by curling the toes. In contrast wooden soled clogs are fastened by laces or buckles on the welt and therefore the toes are relaxed as in shoes. Half open clogs may either be secured like whole foot clogs, or have an additional strap over the top of the foot. Some sandal types, and in particular toe peg styles, are worn more like "flip-flops" and rely on the grip between the big and next toe.

Flexing the foot
As they are primarily made from wood, clogs cannot flex under the ball of the foot as softer shoes do. To allow the foot to roll forward most clogs have the bottom of the toe curved up, known as the cast. Some styles of clogs have "feet", such as Spanish albarca. The clog rotates around the front edge of the front "feet". Some Japanese and Indian clogs have "teeth" or very high pegs attached to the soles. The clog can rotate around the front edge of the front "tooth" as the wearer strides forward. Some medieval pattens were in two pieces, heel through to ball and ball to toes. Joining the two was a leather strip forming a hinge, thus allowing the shoe above to flex.  Klompen may have a carefully placed ease (space left around the foot), which allows the foot to bend, and the heel to lift within or out of the clog. Thick, springy wool socks provide flexibility in the fit.

Origins and history 

The origin of wooden footwear in Europe is not precisely known. De Boer-Olij makes reference to the high, thick-soled boots of the Greek tragedy actors in Antiquity (the buskin) and to the shoes worn by Roman soldiers (the caligae).  However, there is a possibility that the Celtic and Germanic peoples from Southern and Northern Europe were familiar with some sort of wooden foot covering. Archaeological finds of these are not known. Wooden footwear often ended up as firewood and, because of its nature, wood will rot away in the long run. The oldest surviving wooden footwear in Europe is found in Amsterdam and Rotterdam, the Netherlands, and dates from 1230 and 1280. These finds look very similar to the wooden shoes that are still worn in the Netherlands.

Manufacture

Since wooden footwear was a hand-made product, the shape of the footwear, as well as its production process showed great local and regional diversity in style. At the beginning of the 20th century machine-made wooden footwear was introduced. After WW2, in particular, wooden shoes disappeared from sight. They were replaced by more fashionable all-leather and synthetic footwear. At present, only the so-called Swedish clogs (wooden bottom and leather top) is still seen as a trendy fashion item, often as ladies’ high-heeled boots. Nevertheless, traditional wooden footwear is still popular in several regions in Europe and in some occupations, for its practical use. Some historic local variations have recently been replaced by uniform national models.

More information on the various methods of manufacture can be found from the gallery below.

Gallery
Presented below are typical clogs from the countries where they are found. Like many folk items, the boundaries of manufacture and use are regional and therefore do not always exactly follow those of modern states. So, in some countries two or more different types can be found. It is also possible that one type can be found in bordering countries. For example, Danish, German, Dutch, Belgian and clogs from Northwest France look quite similar. The links provide access to pages dealing with the different types of clog, their design, origin and manufacture.

Traditional European clogs

Traditional Asian clogs

Fashion clogs 

In the 1970s and 1980s, Swedish clogs became popular fashion accessories for both sexes. They were usually worn without socks and were considered suitable attire for the avant-garde man.

In the 1980s and 1990s, clogs based on Swedish clogs returned in fashion for women. Platform clogs or sandals, often raised as high as 6 or even 8 inches right through between sole and insole, were worn in many western countries. The large mid layer was often made of solid cork, although some were merely of plastic with a cork covering. The sole, more often than not, was made of a light sandy-colored rubber. 

In 2007, Dutch designers Viktor & Rolf introduced high heeled Dutch clogs on the catwalk, with their winter collection of 2007/08.  In 2010, Swedish clogs for women returned again in Chanel's and Louis Vuitton's Spring / Summer 2010 collection.

Museums 

 Bata Shoe Museum, Canada
 International Wooden Shoe Museum Eelde, Netherlands
 Bai Mi Wooden Clog Village, Taiwan
 Clitheroe Castle Museum, Lancashire, UK

Citations

General and cited references

External links 
 

 
1970s fads and trends
Footwear
Folk footwear
Safety clothing
Shoes
Sandals